The 2016–17 Ukrainian Hockey League season was the 25th season of the Ukrainian Hockey Championship. Six teams participated in the league this season, and HC Donbass won the championship.

Regular season

Play-off

References

Ukrainian Hockey Championship seasons
Ukrainian Hockey Championship
Ukr